Stasov is a rural locality (a khutor) in Kapustinoyarsky Selsoviet of Akhtubinsky District, Astrakhan Oblast, Russia. The population was 106 as of 2010. There is 1 street.

Geography 
Stasov is located 58 km northwest of Akhtubinsk (the district's administrative centre) by road. Tokarev is the nearest rural locality.

References 

Rural localities in Akhtubinsky District